Gamboge is a partially transparent deep saffron to mustard yellow pigment. It is the traditional colour used to dye Buddhist monks' robes, and Theravada Buddhist monks in particular. Physicist Jean Perrin used this pigment to prove Brownian motion in 1908.

Production 
Gamboge is most often extracted by tapping latex (sometimes incorrectly referred to as sap) from various species of evergreen trees of the family Clusiaceae (also known as Guttiferae). The tree most commonly used is the gamboge tree (genus Garcinia), including G. hanburyi (Cambodia and Thailand), G. morella (India and Sri Lanka), and G. elliptica and G. heterandra (Myanmar). The orange fruit of Garcinia gummi-gutta (formerly called G. cambogia) is also known as gamboge or gambooge.

The trees must be at least ten years old before they are tapped. The resin is extracted by making spiral incisions in the bark, and by breaking off leaves and shoots and letting the milky yellow resinous gum drip out. The resulting latex is collected in hollow bamboo canes. After the resin is congealed, the bamboo is broken away and large rods of raw gamboge remain.

Uses 
The pigment first reached Europe in early 17th century, and was used by artists such as Rembrandt, J.M.W. Turner, and Sir Joshua Reynolds. William Hooker mixed it with Prussian blue to create Hooker's Green. By the early 20th century it was replaced by a synthetic, more lightfast pigment, aureolin; however Winsor & Newton continued to sell the resin form until 2005.

Gamboge has strong laxative properties. Small doses are sufficient to produce watery feces, while large doses can be fatal.

Etymology
Its first recorded use as a colour name in English was in 1634.

Notes

References

External links

 
 https://web.archive.org/web/20090410075328/http://www.sewanee.edu/chem/chem%26art/Detail_Pages/Pigments/Gamboge

Organic pigments
Pigments
Resins
Shades of yellow
Shades of orange
Plant dyes